was a Japanese professional shogi player who achieved the rank of 8-dan. He was a former director of the Japan Shogi Association, and his son Kazuhiro is also a professional shogi player.

Shogi professional
Nishikawa finished the 73rd Meijin Class C2 league (April 2014March 2015) with a record of 1 win and 9 losses, earning a third demotion point which meant automatic demotion to "Free Class" play.

He had been on an official leave of absence since the end of 2018 due to health problems.

Promotion history
The promotion history for Nishikawa was as follows:
 5-kyū: 1975
 1-dan: 1978
 4-dan: November 3, 1981
 5-dan: April 1, 1984
 6-dan: May 27, 1988
 7-dan: September 24, 1997
 8-dan: April 1, 2018
 Retired: June 30, 2021

JSA director
Nishikawa served on the Japan Shogi Association's board of directors as a director from 2007 to 2011.

Personal life and death
Nishikawa and his son Kazuhiro were the sixth father-son pair to become professional shogi players and the only pair since the end of World War II. He died on January 17, 2022, at the age of 60.

References

External links
 ShogiHub: Nishikawa, Keiji

1961 births
2022 deaths
Deceased professional shogi players
Japanese shogi players
People from Shinagawa
Professional shogi players from Tokyo